Venus in Leo is the fourth studio album by Australian band HTRK. It was released on 30 August 2019 by Ghostly International. The cover photograph is of Jonnine Standish's childhood home by Warwick Baker.

You Know How to Make Me Happy, the first single from the album was released on 10 July 2019.

Critical reception
Venus in Leo was met with favourable reviews from critics. At Metacritic, which assigns a weighted average rating out of 100 to reviews from mainstream publications, this release received an average score of 78, based on 7 reviews.

Track listing

References

2019 albums
Ghostly International albums